Khary Payton (born May 16, 1972) is an American actor. He is known for his roles as King Ezekiel on the horror drama series The Walking Dead and Dr. Terrell Jackson on the soap opera General Hospital, as well as voicing Cyborg across various DC media and Kaldur'ahm / Aqualad in the animated series Young Justice.

Early life
Payton was born on May 16, 1972 in Augusta, Georgia. At the age of 14, he won Showtime's first annual Kid Talent Quest, and a recording exists of him introducing an animated film called Sherlock Holmes in the Baskerville Curse.

Career

Live-action work
Payton appeared on a recurring basis as Dr. Terrell Jackson on the ABC daytime soap opera General Hospital. He portrays King Ezekiel on AMC's The Walking Dead.

Voice work
Payton has portrayed Cyborg in both Teen Titans animated series and Aqualad in Young Justice. In the cartoon series Justice League, Payton provided the voice of the villain Ten from the Royal Flush Gang. He also provided the voice of Drebin in the game Metal Gear Solid 4: Guns of the Patriots, Ripcord in G.I. Joe: Renegades, Blade in Marvel: Ultimate Alliance, Grimlock in Transformers: Robots in Disguise, Quinn Derringer in République and Killer Croc in Batman: Arkham Underworld and voiced Wasabi on the Disney XD original series Big Hero 6: The Series based on the Marvel Comics by Man of Action and the film of the same name.

Personal life
Payton has three children. He married Linda Braddock in 2001, and they divorced in 2009. He married Stacey Reed in 2010 and they filed for divorce in 2019. He had two children with Reed. He had a son in 2021.

Filmography

Voice over roles

Television

Film

Video games

Live action roles

Television

Film

Awards and nominations

References

External links
 
 

1972 births
Living people
20th-century African-American people
20th-century American male actors
21st-century African-American people
21st-century American male actors
African-American male actors
American male film actors
American male television actors
American male video game actors
American male voice actors
Male actors from Augusta, Georgia
Male actors from Georgia (U.S. state)